The Medal "For Battle Merit" was a Soviet military medal awarded for "combat action resulting in a military success", "courageous defense of the state borders", or "successful military and political training and preparation".

It was created on October 17, 1938 by the decision of the Presidium of the Supreme Soviet of the Soviet Union. Like the Medal "For Courage", its status was revised to prevent the medal from being given for years of service (a practice that was rampant in the USSR) rather than actual bravery during a battle. More than 5,210,000 medals were awarded between 1938 and 1991.

See also
 Awards and decorations of the Soviet Union

References 
 Great Soviet Encyclopedia
 Kolesnikov G.A. & Rozhkov A.M., Orders and medals of USSR, Moscow, Mil. lib., 1983.

Military awards and decorations of the Soviet Union
Awards established in 1938
Awards disestablished in 1992
1938 establishments in the Soviet Union
1992 disestablishments in Russia